Astralium confragosum is a species of sea snail, a marine gastropod mollusk in the family Turbinidae, the turban snails.

Description
The size of the shell varies between 15 mm and 36 mm. Rather low-conic shell is conspicuously radiately plicate above. The folds are somewhat sigmoid and oblique, bearing a series of short rounded knobs above, and terminating in short spines, eighteen to twenty in number, at the carinated periphery. The base of the shell is flat, squamosely lirate. The aperture is tinged with green, especially at the columella. The wrinkled operculum is deep green.

Distribution
This marine species occurs off Hawaii, French Polynesia and the Marianas.

References

External links
 To World Register of Marine Species
 

confragosum
Gastropods described in 1851